Robert Gillies McKenzie "Bobby" Thomson (born 21 March 1937) is a Scottish former professional footballer, who played as a forward. He played most of his professional career in the West Midlands, making over 300 appearances in total for the two Birmingham clubs, and is probably best known for his four years at Aston Villa.

Biography
Thomson was born in Dundee, Scotland. He began his football career as an amateur first with Albion Rovers and then Airdrieonians. Following successful trials he moved to First Division champions Wolverhampton Wanderers in 1953 and signed professional forms in 1954. During Thomson's five years at the club, Wolves won the League twice more and never finished below sixth. However, he was unable to establish himself as a first-team player and managed just one League first-team appearance, scoring in a 2–0 win over Newcastle United on 13 April 1957.

He transferred to Aston Villa, newly relegated to the Second Division, in 1959 for a fee of £8,000. Here, he made an immediate impact, scoring 22 goals in his first season, which made him the club's top scorer and helped them win the 1959–60 Second Division championship. He followed this up with 18 goals the next season and another 18 in 1962–63. He played in the final of the inaugural League Cup competition in 1960–61 in which Aston Villa beat Rotherham United. Two years later he scored in the first leg of the 1963 League Cup Final against Birmingham City, but in the second leg he was marked out of the game by former England centre-half Trevor Smith, a significant factor in Birmingham retaining their 3–1 lead.

In September 1963 Thomson moved to Birmingham City. In his first season, he was used in a variety of positions, eventually settling in at centre-forward alongside the newly arrived and prolific Geoff Vowden. Their goals failed to prevent relegation to the Second Division in 1964–65. In his last full season he played successfully at right half in place of captain Ron Wylie who had broken his leg. Wylie's return to fitness and the arrival of former England centre-forward Fred Pickering left no place for Thomson, so in December 1967 he moved to Third Division Stockport County, and then into non-league football with Bromsgrove Rovers.

Honours
with Aston Villa
Second Division champions 1960
Club's top scorer 1960
League Cup winners 1961
League Cup runners up 1963

Notes

References

External links
Profile at Aston Villa Players Database

1937 births
Living people
Footballers from Dundee
Scottish footballers
Association football forwards
Albion Rovers F.C. players
Airdrieonians F.C. (1878) players
Wolverhampton Wanderers F.C. players
Aston Villa F.C. players
Birmingham City F.C. players
Stockport County F.C. players
Bromsgrove Rovers F.C. players
English Football League players